Rashad DeAndre Vaughn (born August 16, 1996) is an American professional basketball player for the Cleveland Charge of the NBA G League. He played college basketball for the UNLV Runnin' Rebels.

High school career
For the first three years of his high school career, Vaughn attended Robbinsdale Cooper High School in New Hope, Minnesota. As a junior in 2012–13, he averaged 28 points and nine rebounds per game. For his senior year, he transferred to Findlay Prep in Henderson, Nevada where he averaged 19.9 points and 4.9 assists per game in 2013–14. He subsequently earned McDonald's All-American honors and Jordan Brand Classic selection.

College career
After considering offers from Iowa State, Kansas, Kentucky and North Carolina, Vaughn finally committed to UNLV.  Vaughn played one season of college basketball for UNLV where he was named the Mountain West Conference Freshman of the Year after averaging 17.8 points and 4.8 rebounds in 23 games.

College statistics

|-
|style="text-align:left;"|2014–15
|style="text-align:left;"|UNLV
|23||23||32.3||.439||.383||.694||4.8||1.6||.8||.3||17.8
|}

Professional career

Milwaukee Bucks (2015–2018)
On June 25, 2015, Vaughn was selected by the Milwaukee Bucks with the 17th overall pick in the 2015 NBA draft. He later joined the Bucks for the 2015 NBA Summer League and signed his rookie scale contract with the team on July 17. He made his debut for the Bucks in the team's season opener against the New York Knicks on October 28, scoring 10 points off the bench in a 122–97 loss. On March 18, 2016, pursuant to the flexible assignment rule, he was assigned to the Canton Charge, the Cleveland Cavaliers' D-League affiliate. On March 26, he was recalled by the Bucks.

On October 29, 2016, Vaughn scored a career-high 22 points and hit six three-pointers in a 110–108 win over the Brooklyn Nets. On November 19, pursuant to the flexible assignment rule, he was assigned to the Westchester Knicks and was recalled four days later. On November 26, he was reassigned to Westchester and recalled on December 1.

Brooklyn Nets (2018)
On February 5, 2018, Vaughn was traded, along with a second-round pick, to the Brooklyn Nets in exchange for Tyler Zeller. He made his debut for the Nets the following day, collecting one assist in four minutes against the Houston Rockets. On February 8, 2018, Vaughn was traded to the New Orleans Pelicans in exchange for Dante Cunningham. He was waived by the Pelicans two days later.

Orlando Magic (2018)
On February 20, 2018, Vaughn signed a 10-day contract with the Orlando Magic. He signed a second 10-day contract with the Magic on March 2, only to be waived by the team five days later due to injury.

Texas Legends (2018)
On October 8, 2018, the Mavericks announced they signed Vaughn to a training camp deal. He was waived three days later. He then was added to the roster of the Texas Legends, the Mavericks’ G League affiliate.

Delaware Blue Coats (2018–2019)
On December 31, 2018, Vaughn, alongside a 2019 third-round draft pick, was traded to the Delaware Blue Coats for the returning player rights to Askia Booker and a 2019 second-round pick.

Igokea (2019–2020)
On July 30, 2019, Vaughn signed a one-year contract for Igokea of the Adriatic League. He averaged 16.5 points per game.

Budućnost VOLI (2020)
On June 7, 2020, he signed with Budućnost. On October 23, Budućnost and Vaughn parted ways after he appeared in six games.

Prometey (2020–2021)
On December 22, 2020, he has signed with Prometey of the Ukrainian Basketball SuperLeague.

Dnipro (2021)
On August 12, 2021, he has signed with Dnipro of the Ukrainian Basketball SuperLeague. Vaughn averaged 12.2 points, 4 rebounds and 1.6 assists per game. He parted ways with the team on November 28.

Lavrio (2022)
On January 28, 2022, Vaughn signed with Lavrio of the Greek Basket League and the Basketball Champions League. In 12 league games, he averaged 14.4 points, 4.6 rebounds, 1 assist and 0.7 steals, playing around 25 minutes per game.

Cleveland Charge (2022–present)
On October 24, 2022, Vaughn joined the Cleveland Charge training camp roster.

NBA career statistics

Regular season

|-
| style="text-align:left;"| 
| style="text-align:left;"| Milwaukee
| 70 || 6 || 14.3 || .305 || .293 || .800 || 1.3 || .6 || .4 || .2 || 3.1
|-
| style="text-align:left;"| 
| style="text-align:left;"| Milwaukee
| 41 || 2 || 11.2 || .365 || .321 || .400 || 1.2 || .6 || .5|| .2 || 3.5
|-
| style="text-align:left;"| 
| style="text-align:left;"| Milwaukee
| 22 || 0 || 7.9 || .402 || .371 || .667 || .8 || .5 || .2 || .1 || 2.7
|-
| style="text-align:left;"| 
| style="text-align:left;"| Brooklyn
| 1 || 0 || 4.0 || – || – || – || .0 || 1.0 || .0 || .0 || .0
|-
| style="text-align:left;"| 
| style="text-align:left;"| Orlando
| 5 || 0 || 7.0 || .333 || .500 || – || .8 || .0 || .2 || .0 || 1.0
|- class="sortbottom"
| style="text-align:center;" colspan="2"| Career
| 139 || 8 || 12.0 || .337 || .313 || .692 || 1.1 || .5 || .4 || .2 || 3.0

Playoffs

|-
| style="text-align:left;"| 2017
| style="text-align:left;"| Milwaukee
| 3 || 0 || 3.3 || .500 || 1.000 || – || .0 || .0 || .0 || .0 || 2.0
|- class="sortbottom"
| style="text-align:center;" colspan="2"| Career
| 3 || 0 || 3.3 || .500 || 1.000 || – || .0 || .0 || .0 || .0 || 2.0

References

External links

UNLV bio

1996 births
Living people
21st-century African-American sportspeople
ABA League players
African-American basketball players
American expatriate basketball people in Bosnia and Herzegovina
American expatriate basketball people in Greece
American expatriate basketball people in Montenegro
American expatriate basketball people in Ukraine
American men's basketball players
Basketball players from Minneapolis
BC Prometey players
Brooklyn Nets players
Canton Charge players
Delaware Blue Coats players
Findlay Prep alumni
KK Budućnost players
KK Igokea players
Lavrio B.C. players
McDonald's High School All-Americans
Milwaukee Bucks draft picks
Milwaukee Bucks players
Orlando Magic players
Shooting guards
Texas Legends players
UNLV Runnin' Rebels basketball players
Westchester Knicks players